Hidakal  is a village in the southern state of Karnataka, India. It is located in the Raybag taluk of Belgaum district.

Demographics
At the 2001 India census, Hidakal had a population of 12404 with 6289 males and 6115 females.

See also
 Belgaum
 Districts of Karnataka

References

External links
 http://Belgaum.nic.in/

Villages in Belagavi district